"Ram Ranch" is a 2 song by Toronto-based outsider musician Grant MacDonald. The song features a heavy metal musical backdrop (originally an instrumental by Anubys titled "Flying Through the Sky") with explicit homoerotic spoken-word lyrics about an orgy of cowboys taking place at the titular ranch. The song became an internet meme later in the 2010s, inspiring remixes, parodies, fan-made music videos and reaction videos, and has also been used for bait-and-switch trolling. In 2022, the song gained mainstream attention for its use by counter-protesters against the Canada convoy protest. Since 2018, MacDonald has produced more than six hundred follow-up songs. Some bear the "Ram Ranch" title and all of them expand on the "gay cowboy" storyline.

Background 
Little is known about MacDonald, except that he lives in Ottawa, Canada where he records his music. In an interview with Rolling Stone, MacDonald said he initially created "Ram Ranch" as backlash for being turned away from Nashville radio stations for producing LGBTQ-themed songs.

Use during Freedom Convoy 
The song came to prominence in 2022 during the Canada convoy protest. The song was used by counter-protesters to flood Zello channels, to troll protesters attending and organizing the protests.

The hashtag #RamRanchResistance was formed on Twitter as a means of identifying counter-protesters.

MacDonald said he was "totally elated that my song could be used to stand up for science" in response to the use of his song in counter-protesting. On February 14, with the occupation still in progress, MacDonald released an EP, Ottawa Truckers, which referenced both Ottawa protests and "Ram Ranch". The EP's single 20-minute track was later featured on MacDonald's album Truckers.

References

External links 
 

2012 songs
Canadian hard rock songs
COVID-19 pandemic in Canada
Gay male erotica
Internet memes introduced in 2012
Internet trolling
LGBT-related music in Canada
LGBT-related songs
Novelty songs
Outsider music
Political Internet memes
Protest songs
Songs about cowboys and cowgirls
Spoken word